Robert Geoffrey Lloyd (born 18 August 1942) is a Welsh former professional footballer who played as a forward. He made appearances in the English football league with Wrexham and Bradford Park Avenue.

References

1942 births
Living people
Welsh footballers
Association football forwards
Llangollen F.C. players
Colwyn Bay F.C. players
Wrexham A.F.C. players
Bradford (Park Avenue) A.F.C. players
Rhyl F.C. players
English Football League players